Emmanuel Mlundwa (born 17 April 1957) is a Tanzanian boxer. He competed in the men's flyweight event at the 1980 Summer Olympics.

References

1957 births
Living people
Tanzanian male boxers
Olympic boxers of Tanzania
Boxers at the 1980 Summer Olympics
Commonwealth Games competitors for Tanzania
Boxers at the 1978 Commonwealth Games
Place of birth missing (living people)
Flyweight boxers